Dancla Stradivarius may refer to:

Dancla Stradivarius (1703)
Dancla Stradivarius (1708)
Dancla Stradivarius (1710)